The Victoria's Secret Fashion Show is an annual fashion show sponsored by Victoria's Secret, a brand of lingerie and sleepwear. Victoria's Secret uses the show to promote and market its goods in high-profile settings. The show features some of the world's leading fashion models, such as current Victoria's Secret Angels Adriana Lima, Alessandra Ambrosio, Doutzen Kroes, Candice Swanepoel, Lily Aldridge, Lindsay Ellingson, Karlie Kloss, and Behati Prinsloo. Elsa Hosk received billing.

The show featured performances by Taylor Swift, Fall Out Boy, A Great Big World, and Neon Jungle.

The shoes used during this fashion show were created by Nicholas Kirkwood.

Segments 
The following listing of the segments are according to their actual order of appearance. The segments appeared partly in non-chronological order: The "Shipwrecked"-segment appeared as the second segment followed by "Parisian Nights" as third; "Birds of Paradise" as fourth and "PINK Network" as the fifth segment.

Segment 1: British Invasion

Segment 2: Birds of Paradise

Segment 3: Shipwrecked

Segment 4: PINK Network

Segment 5: Parisian Nights

Segment 6: Snow Angels

Finale 

 Adriana Lima and  Candice Swanepoel lead the finale.

Index

References

External links
Victoria's Secret Fashion Show, Vogue UK.
The Top 20 Looks from the Victoria's Secret Fashion Show, Harper's Bazaar.
The 2013 Victoria's Secret Fashion Show, GQ

Victoria's Secret
2013 in fashion